Blaž Jakopič (born 1 November 1945 in Bled) is a Slovenian former alpine skier who competed for Yugoslavia in the 1968 Winter Olympics.

External links
 sports-reference.com
 

1945 births
Living people
Slovenian male alpine skiers
Olympic alpine skiers of Yugoslavia
Alpine skiers at the 1968 Winter Olympics
People from Bled
20th-century Slovenian people